The Aapua wind park is a wind park on Eta, southwest of Aapua, Övertorneå municipality in Norrbotten County, Sweden. , it is the northernmost wind park in Sweden. The park is owned by Aapua Vind AB, representing 14 private investors, and operates on land owned by the state-owned Sveaskog, Sweden's largest forest owner. The plant came online in 2005

Technical
The park consists of seven 1.5 MW Vestas V82-1.5 MW Arctic wind turbines with a total stated power of 9.9 MW (10.5 MW according to supplier Vestas). Each unit has a nacelle height of 78 m and a rotor diameter of 82 m.

See also

 List of wind farms in Sweden

References

Wind farms in Sweden